Boštjan Frelih (born 10 February 1993) is a Slovenian footballer who plays as left back.

References

External links
PrvaLiga profile 

1993 births
Living people
Slovenian footballers
Association football midfielders
Association football fullbacks
ND Gorica players
NK Brda players
NK Krško players
NK Inter Zaprešić players
Slovenian PrvaLiga players
Footballers from Ljubljana